The 1950 CTA Streetcar Crash, also known as the Green Hornet Streetcar Disaster, occurred on May 25, 1950, when a Chicago Transit Authority (CTA) streetcar collided with a gasoline truck in Chicago, Illinois, United States. The resulting explosion killed 34 people and injured 50 others, remaining one of the most deadly public transit disasters in Chicago history. Over 100 people were made homeless by the collateral damage to adjacent buildings.

Crash 
The collision occurred at the intersection of 63rd and State Streets at around 6:30pm on May 25, 1950. The streetcar was headed south on State Street but suddenly switched eastbound to avoid a flooded underpass. "Apparently, the motorman of the streetcar was not paying attention, and went through that switch at total velocity, and hit the side of that truck with dire consequences," said Craig Cleve, author of the book The Green Hornet Streetcar Disaster. The gasoline truck jackknifed after the collision and blocked State Street 200 feet north of 63rd Street. The motorman of the streetcar, Paul Manning, died at his post. The driver of the truck, Mel Wilson, died in the cab of the truck while the conductor of the streetcar, William C. Liddell, survived.

14 year old Beverley Clark was alone as a passenger on the tram at the point of collision and managed to open the center door using the emergency handle, saving several people from the inferno. The passengers swelled to the rear doors (which opened inwards). The conductor William Liddell managed to temporarily open the rear doors. Arleen Franzen escaped through a small side window but others got trapped in this small gap.

Consequences 

Thirty-four people died in the streetcar while 50 people, some on the streetcar and others in the surrounding area, were injured. According to the National Safety Council’s report two days after the crash, it was the largest death toll from a motor vehicle collision, surpassing the 29 people killed in a 1940 Texas train-truck collision. Some victims were identified immediately because of personal belongings whereas other victims were identified at the Cook County Morgue by friends and relatives in the days following the crash.

In addition to the lives lost, nearby buildings and parked cars were consumed by the flames. Five buildings were completely destroyed on the east side of State Street between the 6239 and 6247 addresses. The total property damage was estimated to be around $150,000 (estimated to be $1,502,663.90 in 2016). William C. Liddell, the streetcar conductor, disappeared after the crash but was arrested the day after, charged with leaving the scene of the accident.

Aftermath 

In 1955, the Chicago Transit Authority claimed it paid a total of $900,000 to families of the deceased. The accident was highly investigated, drawing conclusions as to what could prevent another such catastrophe. Among them were the addition of drainage systems for frequently flooded underpasses so operators would not have to detour, two yearly physical examinations of motormen and streetcar doors that could remain open in case of an emergency to allow for evacuation. However, in 1958 the CTA elected to stop using streetcars entirely. They were replaced by bus routes that still run today.

See also 
 List of tram accidents
 1972 Chicago commuter rail crash
 1977 Chicago Loop derailment

References 

1950s in Chicago
CTA Streecar Crash
Tram accidents
May 1950 events in the United States
Transport disasters in 1950
1950 disasters in the United States
Explosions in the United States
Transportation disasters in Illinois